Castrillo de la Valduerna, is a municipality located in the province of León, Castile and León, Spain. According to the 2010 census (INE), the municipality has a population of 190 inhabitants.

See also
 Kingdom of León
 Leonese language

References

Municipalities in the Province of León
Tierra de La Bañeza